Drive on Stalingrad: Battle for Southern Russia Game is a board wargame originally published by Simulations Publications, Inc. (SPI) in 1977 that simulates Germany's 1942 campaign in Russia during the Second World War.

Contents
Drive on Stalingrad: Battle for Southern Russia Game is a two-person game that simulates combat between German and Russian forces in 1942. The rules are based on those developed for a previous SPI wargame, Panzergruppe Guderian, with additional rules for rail movement, Soviet strategic movement, trucks and supply chains, untried units, air supply, and tactical air units. In addition, at the start of every turn, the German player receives a random "Hitler Directive", which may unexpectedly change the player's entire operational strategy for the turn by placing demands and restrictions on the player.

Components
The SPI edition of this game, packaged in either a flat plastic  box with integral counter trays and covers, or a standard-sized bookcase box, contains the following:
 Two  hexagonal grid paper maps
 600 double-sided  die-cut Counters
 Rulebook
 Game Turn Record/Reinforcement Track
 A double-sided sheet of various tables
 Errata sheet (included in the game after May 1978)
 A six-sided die

Gameplay
The German player starts each turn by getting a random result from the "Hitler Directive" table, and then has the following actions:
 Initial movement phase
 Combat phase
 Mechanized/cavalry movement phase
 Disruption removal phase
 Air interdiction phase
The Soviet player then gets the same five phases of operations. This completes one turn.

Victory conditions   
The game lasts for 25 turns, with a time scale of 1 week per turn. Victory points are awarded for cities captured and held, and losses inflicted on the other side. The player with the most victory points at the end of 25 turns is the winner.

Publication history
In 1976, SPI published Panzergruppe Guderian, a wargame simulating the 1941 World War II Battle of Smolensk that featured rules that combined both infantry and tank combat. Brad Hessel used those rules as the basis for Drive on Stalingrad, which was published by SPI in 1977. Players immediately complained that the game was always an easy win for the Russian player, and in May 1978, an errata sheet was added to the game to provide more balance.

In the early 1980s, SPI ran into financial difficulties, and was taken over by TSR in 1983. Looking to quickly make back some of the money, TSR released a combination of new SPI properties that had been close to publication before the takeover such as Battle Over Britain and A Gleam of Bayonets: The Battle of Antietam, and re-issues of popular SPI titles from the 1970s such as Blue & Gray: Four American Civil War Battles and Drive on Stalingrad.

In 2002, Decision Games acquired the rights to Drive on Stalingrad and published a game with rules redesigned by Ty Bomba.

Reception
In Issue 15 of Imagine, Peter O'Toole thought "the game rules are excellent" and noted in particular the well-balanced rules for supply lines that affect both players. He concluded with a strong recommendation, saying, "Drive on Stalingrad is an exciting end-to-end struggle with both sides having to use all their skills in both attack and defence."

In Issue No. 49 of Moves, Ronald P. Hamm noted that the inherited rules from Panzergruppe Guderian "works extremely well for 1939–1942 armored actions and it proves that fact again with DOS." Hamm was glad he waited until errata was published with the game, noting "I did not have the unfortunate task of playing DOS when it was unbalanced drastically towards the Soviets. I am glad that I waited, because the game (like the real campaign itself) is now finely balanced." He concluded with a strong recommendation, saying "Drive on Stalingrad is an excellent operational level simulation of the German 1942 summer offensive in Russia."

In Issue 14 of Phoenix, Chris Bramwell pointed out that Drive on Stalingrad differed significantly from its predecessor Panzergrupped Guderian (1976) with the addition of air rules and especially political considerations — "The Hitler Directive" — which he called "the cornerstone of the game."

In his 1977 book The Comprehensive Guide to Board Wargaming, Nick Palmer noted the additional complications caused by rules for untried units, as well as the shifting objectives for the German player.

In The Guide to Simulations/Games for Education and Training, Richard Rydzel thought the game was fatally unbalanced against the Germans, saying, "The Axis player can only win against an incompetent player." He also counselled against using this game in the classroom because of its historical inaccuracies, pointing out that in the game "The Don River is a fortress that cannot be breached. Stalingrad  never sees any action. [...] This game does not fit well into historical learning situations."

Other reviews and commentary
Moves #50 (April/May 1980)
Fire & Movement #63 (December 1988/January1989) 
The Wargamer Vol. 1 #33
The Grenadier #28 
Campaign #105
Paper Wars #50
Simulations Canada Newsletter #12
Casus Belli (Nov 1980)

References

Simulations Publications games
Wargames introduced in 1977
World War II board wargames